Alice Duncalf is a former Canadian international lawn bowler.

Bowls career
Duncalf has represented Canada at two Commonwealth Games at the 1986 Commonwealth Games and the 1994 Commonwealth Games.

She has won two medals at the Asia Pacific Bowls Championships.

She is a nine times Canadian champion  and nine times Vancouver & District singles champion.

Personal life
Her husband was Dave Duncalf.

References

Canadian female bowls players
Living people
Bowls players at the 1986 Commonwealth Games
Bowls players at the 1994 Commonwealth Games
Year of birth missing (living people)
20th-century Canadian women